The 1900 Colorado Silver and Gold football team was an American football team that represented the University of Colorado as a member of the Colorado Football Association (CFA) during the 1900 college football season. Led by Theron W. Mortimer in his first and only season as head coach, Colorado compiled an overall record of 6–4 with a mark of 1–2 in conference play, placing third in the CFA. Mortimer replaced Fred Folsom, who had been head coach from 1895 to 1899 and returned to helm the team in 1901.

Schedule

References

Colorado
Colorado Buffaloes football seasons
Colorado Silver and Gold football